Please add names of notable painters with a Wikipedia page, in precise English alphabetical order, using U.S. spelling conventions. Country and regional names refer to where painters worked for long periods, not to personal allegiances. The information on each entry is referenced on its page. There is no reason in principle why the reference it should not appear here as well.

Ma Lin (馬麟, c. 1180 – post-1256), Chinese court painter
Ma Shi (馬軾, c. 14th century), Chinese painter and poet
Ma Quan (馬荃, late 17th/18th century), Chinese painter
Ma Wan (馬琬, c. early 13th century), Chinese painter, calligrapher and poet
Ma Yuan (馬遠, 1160/1165–1225), Chinese painter
Ma Yuanyu (馬元馭, 1669–1722), Chinese painter
Manabu Mabe (1924–1997), Japanese/Brazilian painter
Robert Walker Macbeth (1848–1910), Scottish/British painter, etcher and watercolorist
Henry Macbeth-Raeburn (1860–1947), Scottish painter and printmaker
Robert MacBryde (1813–1866), Scottish/English painter and set designer
Dugald Sutherland MacColl (1859–1948), Scottish/English painter, critic and writer
Frances MacDonald (1873–1921), Scottish artist and designer
Frances Macdonald (1914–2002), English painter
Hamish MacDonald (1935–2008), Scottish painter
Stanton Macdonald-Wright (1890–1973), American painter
James Pittendrigh MacGillivray (1856–1938), Scottish sculptor, musician and poet
William York Macgregor (1855–1923), Scottish painter
Joe Machine (born 1973), English artist, poet and writer
August Macke (1887–1914), German painter
Esther Blaikie MacKinnon (1885–1934), Scottish painter and engraver
Charles Rennie Mackintosh (1868–1928), Scottish architect, designer and water-colorist
Margaret Macdonald Mackintosh (1864–1933), Scottish artist and designer
Daniel Maclise (1806–1870), Irish/English painter and illustrator
Chica Macnab (1889–1981), Scottish painter and engraver
Herbert MacNair (1868–1955), Scottish artist, designer and teacher
Nicolette Macnamara (1911–1987), English painter and author
Elizabeth MacNicol (1869–1904), Scottish painter
William MacTaggart (1903–1981), Scottish painter
Viktor Madarász (1840–1917), Hungarian painter
Conroy Maddox (1912–2005), English painter, collagist and lecturer
Carlo Maderna (1556–1629), Italian architect
Maeda Masao (前田政雄, 1904–1974), Japanese woodblock printer
Maeda Seison (前田青邨, 1885–1977), Japanese nihonga painter
Nicolaes Maes (1634–1693), Dutch painter
John Maggs (1819–1896), English painter
René Magritte (1898–1967), Belgian artist
Charles Mahoney (1903–1968), English muralist and teacher
Aristide Maillol (1861–1944), French sculptor, painter and print-maker
Theodore Major (1908–1999), English artist
Hans Makart (1840–1884), Austrian painter, designer and decorator
Americo Makk (1927–2015), Hungarian/American painter
Maki Haku (巻白, 1924–2000), Japanese artist
Konstantin Makovsky (1839–1915), Russian painter
Vladimir Makovsky (1846–1920), Russian painter, art collector and teacher
Tadeusz Makowski (1882–1932), Polish/French painter
Kees Maks (1876–1967), Dutch painter
Jacek Malczewski (1858–1929), Polish painter
Estuardo Maldonado (born 1930), Ecuadorian sculptor and painter
Władysław Malecki (1836–1900), Polish painter
Kazimir Malevich (1878–1935), Russian artist and art theorist
Anita Malfatti (1889–1964), Brazilian artist
José Malhoa (1855–1933), Portuguese painter
Maruja Mallo (1902–1995), Spanish painter
Jean Malouel (1365–1415), Dutch/Burgundian court painter
Teobaldo Nina Mamani (born 1968), Peruvian painter and art professor
Cornelis de Man (1621–1706), Dutch painter
Man Ray (1890–1976), American/French visual artist
Jack C. Mancino (born 1968), Hungarian/German painter, graphic artist and musician
Edna Mann (1926–1985), English painter
Harrington Mann (1864–1937), Scottish artist and decorative painter
Johan Edvard Mandelberg (1736–1786), Swedish/Danish painter
Karel van Mander (1548–1606), Flemish painter, poet and art theorist
Josef Mánes (1820–1871) Austro-Hungarian (Czech) painter
Alfred Manessier (1911–1993) French painter and stained-glass and tapestry designer
Édouard Manet (1832–1883), French painter
Miltos Manetas (born 1964), Greek/Colombian painter and multimedia artist
Joe Mangrum (born 1969), American installation and multimedia artist
Jim Manley (born 1934), English/Northern Irish artist
Alexander Mann (1853–1908), Scottish painter
Totte Mannes  (born 1933), Finnish/Spanish visual artist
Paul Howard Manship (1885–1966), American sculptor
George Manson (1850–1876), Scottish water-colorist
James Bolivar Manson (1879–1945), English artist and Tate Gallery Director
Andrea Mantegna (c. 1431 – 1506), Italian painter
Niklaus Manuel (1484–1530), Swiss artist, writer and politician
Adam Manyoki (1673–1756), Hungarian painter
Julius Edvard Marak (1832–1899), Austro-Hungarian (Czech) painter and graphic designer
Franz Marc (1880–1916), German painter and print-maker
Conrad Marca-Relli (1913–2000), American artist
Louis Marcoussis (1883–1941), Polish/French painter and engraver
Adam Marczyński (1908–1985), Polish painter
Brice Marden (born 1938), American artist
Ödön Márffy (1878–1959), Hungarian painter
De Hirsh Margules (1899–1965), American painter
Carlos Francisco Chang Marín (born 1922), Panamanian artist, musician and activist
John Marin (1870–1953), American artist
Jacob Maris (1837–1899), Dutch painter
Matthijs Maris (1839–1917), Dutch painter, etcher and lithographer
Willem Maris (1844–1910), Dutch painter
Yoshio Markino (牧野義雄, 1869–1956), Japanese painter and author
Károly Markó the Elder (1793–1860), Hungarian/Italian painter
Terry Marks (born 1960), American painter
Simon Marmion (1425–1489), French/Burgundian panel painter and illuminator
Jacques Maroger (1884–1962), French painter and Louvre Museum technical director
Luděk Marold (1865–1898), Austro-Hungarian (Czech) painter and illustrator
Albert Marquet (1875–1947), French painter
Jacob Marrel (1614–1681), German/Dutch painter
Luis Marsans (born 1930), Spanish (Catalan) painter
Nicholas Marsicano (1908–1991), American artist
Wilhelm Marstrand (1810–1873), Danish painter and illustrator
Agnes Martin (1912–2004), American painter
Eugene J. Martin (1938–2005), American visual artist
Fletcher Martin (1904–1979), American painter, illustrator and educator
John Martin (1789–1854), American painter, engraver and illustrator
Knox Martin (born 1923), American painter, sculptor and muralist
Carlo Martini (1908–1958), Italian painter and academician
Ndoc Martini (1880–1916), Albanian painter
Raúl Martínez (1927–1995), Cuban/American painter, photographer and graphic artist
Johannes Martini (1866–1935), German painter and graphic artist
Simone Martini (c. 1284 – 1344), Italian painter
Andrey Yefimovich Martynov (1768–1826), Russian painter and engraver
Maruyama Ōkyo (円山応挙, 1733–1795), Japanese artist
Tommaso Masaccio (1401–1428), Italian painter
Frans Masereel (1889–1971), Flemish painter and graphic artist
Vicente Juan Masip (1507–1579), Spanish painter
Stanisław Masłowski (1853–1926), Polish painter
Masolino (c. 1383 – 1447), Italian painter
Alice Mason (1904–1971), American painter
Emily Mason (1932–2019), American painter and print-maker
Frank Mason (1921–2009), American painter and teacher
Master of Affligem (15th/16th c.), Netherlandish painter
Master of Saint Giles (fl. c. 1500), French or Flemish painter
Master of the Bambino Vispo (early 15th century), Italian painter
Master of the Embroidered Foliage (fl. 1480–1510), Netherlandish painter(s)
Master of the Legend of Saint Lucy (fl. 1480–1510), Netherlandish painter
Jan Matejko (1838–1893), Polish painter
Zsuzsa Máthé (born 1964), Hungarian painter
Henri Matisse (1869–1954), French painter, print-maker and sculptor
Matsui Fuyoko (松井冬子, born 1974) Japanese nihonga painter
Matsumura Goshun (松村呉春, 1752–1811), Japanese painter
Matsuno Chikanobu (松野親信, fl. 1720s), Japanese ukiyo-e painter
Quentin Matsys (c. 1466 – 1530), Flemish painter
Roberto Matta (1911–2002), Chilean painter
Louisa Matthíasdóttir (1917–2000), Icelandic/American painter
Jaakko Mattila (born 1976), Finnish painter
Eszter Mattioni (1902–1993), Hungarian painter
Karl Matzek (1890–1983), Yugoslav (Bosnian) painter
Jeanne du Maurier (1911–1997), English artist
Anton Mauve (1838–1888), Dutch painter
Paul Mavrides (born 1945), American artist, performer and writer
Peter Max (born 1937), German/American artist
Vassily Maximov (1844–1911), Russian painter
John Maxwell (1905–1962), Scottish painter
Richard Mayhew (born 1934), American painter and arts educator
The Mazeking (born 1968), American visual artist
Peter McArdle (born 1965), English artist and gallery owner
Charles McAuley (1910–1999), Irish painter
James McBey (1883–1959), Scottish artist, etcher and WW1 war artist
Colin McCahon (1919–1987), New Zealand artist
Sheila McClean (1932–2016), Irish painter
Daphne McClure (born 1930), English painter 
Mary McCrossan (1865–1934), English painter
Frederick McCubbin (1855–1917), Australian artist and art teacher
Horatio McCulloch (1805–1867), Scottish painter
Mary McEvoy (1870–1941), English painter
Rory McEwen (1932–1982), Scottish artist and musician
Fanny McIan (c. 1814 – 1897), English painter
R. R. McIan (1803–1856), Scottish/English painter and actor
Frank McKelvey (1895–1974), Irish/Northern Irish painter
John McLaughlin (1898–1976), American painter
Bruce McLean (born 1944), Scottish sculptor, performance artist and painter
William McTaggart (1835–1910), Scottish painter
Lewis Henry Meakin (1850–1917), American artist
Dimitre Manassiev Mehandjiysky (1915–1999), Bulgarian painter and designer
Robert Medley (1905–1994), English artist and theater designer
László Mednyánszky (1852–1919), Hungarian painter and philosopher
Józef Mehoffer (1869–1946), Polish painter and decorative artist
Howard Mehring (1931–1978), American painter
Bernardino Mei (1612/1615–1676), Italian painter and engraver
Mei Qing (梅清, c. 1623–1697), Japanese painter, calligrapher and poet
Victor Meirelles (1832–1903), Brazilian painter
Jean-Louis-Ernest Meissonier (1815–1891), French painter and sculptor
Cor Melchers (1954–2015), Dutch painter
Vadym Meller (1884–1962), Russian/Soviet painter, illustrator and architect
Antoine Ignace Melling (1763–1831), Levantine/French painter, architect and voyager
Arthur Melville (1858–1904), Scottish painter
Hans Memling (c. 1435 – 1494), German/Netherlandish painter
Milton Menasco (1890–1974), American painter and movie director
Menez (1926–1995), Portuguese painter
Bernard Meninsky (1891–1950), English artist, draftsman and teacher
Barthélemy Menn (1815–1893), Swiss painter and draftsman
Carlo Mense (1886–1965), German artist
Adolph Menzel (1815–1905), German painter, draftsman and etcher
Alexey Merinov (born 1959), Russian painter and cartoonist
Betty Merken (living), American painter and print-maker
Pál Szinyei Merse (1845–1920), Hungarian painter and educator
Luc-Olivier Merson (1846–1920), French painter and illustrator
Hans Mertens (1906–1944), German painter
Arnold Mesches (born 1923), American visual artist
Hendrik Willem Mesdag (1831–1915), Dutch painter
Jean Messagier (1920–1999), French painter, sculptor and poet
Youri Messen-Jaschin (born 1941), Swiss artist and designer
Ken Messer (1931–2018), British watercolourist and draftsman
Antonello da Messina (c. 1430 – 1479), Italian painter
Ludwig Mestler (1891–1959), Austrian/American painter
Ivan Meštrović (1883–1962), Austro-Hungarian (Croatian)/Yugoslav sculptor, architect and writer
Attila Meszlenyi (born 1954), Hungarian painter, ecologist and musician
Géza Mészöly (1844–1887), Hungarian painter
Willard Metcalf (1858–1925), American painter and instructor
Gabriel Metsu (1629–1667), Dutch painter
Jean Metzinger (1883–1956), French painter, critic and poet
Johann Heinrich Meyer (1760–1832), Swiss/German painter and art writer
Otto Meyer-Amden (1885–1933), Swiss painter and graphic artist
Mi Fu (米芾, 1051–1107), Chinese painter, poet and calligrapher
Miao Fu (繆輔, fl. early 15th century), Chinese imperial painter
Peter Michael (born 1972), English painter
Piotr Michałowski (1800–1855), Polish painter
Henri Michaux (1899–1984), Belgian/French poet, writer and painter
Michelangelo Buonarroti (1475–1564), Italian sculptor, painter and poet
Leo Michelson (1887–1978), Latvian/French painter, print-maker and sculptor
David Michie (1928–2015), Scottish artist
Colin Middleton (1910–1983), Irish artist
Eugeen Van Mieghem (1875–1930), Belgian painter and draftsman
Jan Miel (1599–1663), Flemish painter and engraver
Michiel Jansz. van Mierevelt (1567–1641), Dutch painter and draftsman
Frans van Mieris the Elder (1635–1681), Dutch painter
Frans van Mieris the Younger (1689–1763), Dutch painter
Jan van Mieris (1660–1690), Dutch painter
Willem van Mieris (1662–1747), Dutch painter
Abraham Mignon (1640–1679), German/Dutch painter
Daniël Mijtens (1590–1647), Dutch/English painter
Jay Milder (born 1934), American painter
Ksenia Milicevic (born 1942), French painter, architect and town planner
John Everett Millais (1829–1896), English painter and illustrator
Manolo Millares (born 1926), Spanish painter
William Miller (1796–1882), Scottish engraver and water-colorist
Francis Davis Millet (1846–1912), American painter, sculptor and writer
Jean-François Millet (1814–1875), French painter, draftsman and etcher
Lisa Milroy (born 1959), Canadian/English painter
Min Zhen (閔貞, 1730–1788), Chinese painter and seal carver
Luis Miranda (born 1932), Ecuadorian painter
Joan Miró (1893–1983), Spanish painter, sculptor and ceramicist
Augustyn Mirys (1700–1790), Polish painter
Fred Mitchell, (born 1923), American artist
Stanley Matthew Mitruk (1922–2006), American artist
Miyagawa Chōshun (宮川長春, 1683–1753), Japanese ukiyo-e painter
Miyagawa Isshō (宮川一笑, 1689–1780), Japanese ukiyo-e painter
Miyagawa Shunsui (宮川春水, fl. c. 1740s–1760s), Japanese ukiyo-e painter and print-maker
Tracey Moberly (born 1964), Welsh/English artist, author and radio host
Amedeo Modigliani (1884–1920), Italian/French painter and sculptor
Claes Corneliszoon Moeyaert (1592–1655), Dutch painter
László Moholy-Nagy (1895–1946), Hungarian painter, photographer and professor
Jan Miense Molenaer (1610–1668), Dutch painter
Luis Molinari (born 1929), Ecuadorian artist and innovator
Anton Möller (1563–1611), German painter and draftsman
Sylvia Molloy (1914–2008) English/South African artist and teacher
Joos de Momper (1564–1635), Flemish painter
Piet Mondrian (1872–1944), Dutch painter and theorist
Blanche Hoschedé Monet (1865–1947), French painter
Claude Monet (1840–1926), French painter
Paul Monnier (1907–1982), Swiss painter
Eugene Montgomery (1905–2001), American painter and illustrator
Albert Joseph Moore (1841–1893), English painter
Frank Montague Moore (1877–1967), English/American painter and museum director
Mona Moore (1917–2000), English painter and illustrator
Otto Morach (1887–1973), Swiss painter and poster artist
Rodolfo Morales (1925–2001), Mexican painter
Thomas Moran (1837–1926), American painter and print-maker
Giorgio Morandi (1890–1964), Italian painter and print-maker
Jacob More (1740–1793), Scottish/Italian painter
Gustave Moreau (1826–1898), French painter
Paulus Moreelse (1571–1638), Dutch painter
Ernest Morgan (1881–1954), Welsh architect and painter
Harry Morley (1881–1943), English painter and engraver
Camilo Mori (1896–1973), Chilean painter
Mori Sosen (森狙仙, 1747–1821), Japanese painter
Yoshitoshi Mori (森義利, 1898–1992), Japanese kappazuri stencil printer
Berthe Morisot (1841–1895), French painter
Malcolm Morley (born 1931), English/American artist
Sergio Rossetti Morosini (1953– ), Brazilian-American painter, sculptor and author
Carey Morris (1922–1968), Welsh/English painter, illustrator and author
Carl Morris (1911–1993), American painter
James Morris (1908–1989), Welsh/English World War II artist
Terry Morris (born 1965), Welsh artist and photographer
George Morrison (1919–2000), American painter and sculptor
James Morrison (born 1932), Scottish painter
John Lowrie Morrison (born 1948), Scottish painter
Alberto Morrocco (1917–1998), Scottish painter and teacher
Samuel F. B. Morse (1791–1872), American inventor and painter
Richard Mortensen (1910–1993), Danish painter
Thomas Corsan Morton (1859–1928), Scottish painter and Keeper of the Scottish National Gallery
William H. Mosby (1898–1964), American artist and teacher
Jill Moser (born 1956), American painter
Mary Moser (1744–1819), English painter
Colin Moss (1914–2005), English artist, teacher and World War II camouflage designer
John Mossman (1817–1890), English/Scottish sculptor
William Mossman (1793–1851), Scottish sculptor
Robert Motherwell (1915–1991), American painter and print-maker
Frederik de Moucheron (1633–1686), Dutch painter
Didier Mouron (born 1958), Swiss/Canadian artist
Charles Mozley (1914–1991), English painter and illustrator
Ivan Mrkvička (1856–1938), Austro-Hungarian (Czech)/Bulgarian painter
Master MS (fl. 16th century), Hungarian or German painter 
Muqi (c. 1201 – c. 1269), Chinese painter and monk
Alphonse Mucha (1860–1939), Austro-Hungarian (Czech)/French painter, illustrator and graphic artist
Georg Muche (1895–1987), German artist, architect and teacher
Olive Mudie-Cooke (1890–1925), English painter
Muggur (1891–1924), Icelandic painter, graphic artist and actor
Pieter Mulier the Elder (1610–1670), Dutch painter
Pieter Mulier II (1637–1701), Dutch/Italian painter
Sheila Mullen (born 1942), Scottish painter
Jan Müller (1922–1958), American artist
Maler Müller (1749–1825), German painter, poet and dramatist
Adolfo Müller-Ury (1862–1947), Swiss/American painter
Munakata Shikō (棟方志功, 1903–1975), Japanese woodblock print-maker
Edvard Munch (1863–1944), Norwegian painter
Gustaf Munch-Petersen (1912–1938), Danish writer and painter
Loren Munk (born 1951), American painter, draftsman and mosaic artist
Mihály Munkácsy (1844–1900), Hungarian painter
Sir Alfred Munnings (1875–1959), English painter
Glòria Muñoz (born 1949), Spanish painter and art professor
Gabriele Münter (1877–1962), German painter
Muqi (牧谿, c. 1210 c. –1269), Chinese painter and monk
Kagaku Murakami (村上華岳, 1888–1939), Japanese painter and illustrator
Takashi Murakami (born 1963), Japanese painter, sculptor and merchandise artist
John Murdoch (born 1971), American painter and art teacher
Bartolomé Esteban Murillo (1617–1682), Spanish painter
Dr. Atl (1875–1964), Mexican painter and writer
Elizabeth Murray (1940–2007), American painter, print-maker and draftsman
Edo Murtić (1921–2005), Danish painter and writer
Italo Mus (1892–1967), American painter, draftsman and mosaic artist
Saneatsu Mushanokōji (武者小路実篤, 1885–1976), Japanese artist, novelist and philosopher
Zoran Mušič (1909–2005), Yugoslav/Slovenian painter, print-maker and draftsman
Michiel van Musscher (1645–1705), Dutch painter
Girolamo Muziano (1532–1592), Italian painter
Grigoriy Myasoyedov (1834–1911), Russian painter
Johannes Mytens (1614–1670), Dutch painter
Caroline Mytinger (1897–1980), American painter

References

M